Düsseldorf-Gerresheim station is a through station in the district of Gerresheim in the city of Düsseldorf in the German state of North Rhine-Westphalia. The station was opened along with the Düsseldorf–Elberfeld railway from Düsseldorf to Erkrath by the Düsseldorf-Elberfeld Railway Company on 20 December 1838. It has two platform tracks and it is classified by Deutsche Bahn as a category 5 station. Its station building, which has been refurbished as Kulturbahnhof (culture station) is the oldest extant station building in Germany.

The station is served by Rhine-Ruhr S-Bahn lines S 8 between Mönchengladbach and Wuppertal-Oberbarmen or Hagen every 20 minutes, S 28 between Mettmann Stadtwald or Wuppertal Hauptbahnhof and Kaarster See every 20 and several S 68 services between Wuppertal-Vohwinkel and Langenfeld in the peak hour.

It is also served by Stadtbahn line U73 (every 10 minutes) and four bus routes: 730 (10), 736 (20), 736 (20/40) and 737 (20), all operated  by  Rheinbahn.

References

Düsseldorf VRR stations
S8 (Rhine-Ruhr S-Bahn)
S68 (Rhine-Ruhr S-Bahn)
S28 (Rhine-Ruhr S-Bahn)
Rhine-Ruhr S-Bahn stations
Railway stations in Germany opened in 1838
1838 establishments in Prussia